A Grant loaf is a wholemeal bread, invented by accident in World War II by baker Doris Grant to encourage workers to eat well on their rations. The loaf was subsequently named after her. It is peculiar amongst breads made with a yeast in that kneading is not necessary.

Typical recipe
450g strong wholemeal flour (alternatively you can use Spelt)
1 tsp brown sugar such as Muscovado (1 tablespoon of honey may be used instead)
2 teaspoons of salt
Yeast
400-450ml of hand-hot water

Begin by warming the flour in your oven for about 10 minutes on the lowest heat.

Place the warmed flour into a bowl and add the salt, sugar and yeast. Mix these together, make a small well in the centre and gradually  add the water, using your hands or a wooden spoon to combine all the ingredients into a dough. (At this point the dough may seem quite wet, which is normal for a Doris Grant loaf.)

Move the dough to a floured pastry board and stretch it out into an oblong. Take one side, fold it into the centre and do the same for the other side, turn it over and repeat. Place the dough into a well greased tin, cover with a sprinkling of flour and leave to rise for 30–40 minutes in a warm place, or for about an hour at room temperature.

Pre-heat the oven to 200°C and bake the bread for 30–40 minutes. The bread should sound hollow when tapped if it is fully cooked.  Return the bread to the oven (out of the tin) for a further 5–10 minutes to crisp up the base and sides. Leave to cool on a wire rack.

References

External links
Delia Smith's version of the recipe with cooking instructions

United Kingdom home front during World War II
Wartime recipes
Yeast breads
British breads